Dmitriy Kapitonov (born April 10, 1968) is a former long-distance runner from Russia, who won the 1997 edition of the Enschede Marathon, on June 8, 1997, clocking a total time of 2:12:09. He represented his native country at the 2000 Summer Olympics at the men's marathon in Sydney, Australia. There he finished in 34th place (2:19:38).

Achievements
All results regarding marathon, unless stated otherwise

References

1968 births
Living people
Russian male long-distance runners
Athletes (track and field) at the 2000 Summer Olympics
Olympic athletes of Russia
Place of birth missing (living people)
Russian male marathon runners